WBFG (96.5 FM) is a radio station licensed to Parker's Crossroads, Tennessee, and serving rural West Tennessee and Jackson. The station broadcasts a talk radio format and is owned by Lexington Broadcasting, LLC. The station brands itself as "News-Talk West Tennessee" and also produces local coverage of local high school football and basketball.

WBFG has an effective radiated power (ERP) of 6,000 watts as a Class A FM station.  The transmitter is on Enochs Lane near Tennessee State Route 22 in Parker's Crossroads.

History
The station received its construction permit from the Federal Communications Commission in the late 1990s.  The original owner, planning a Christian radio format, chose the call sign WBFG for the slogan "We Broadcast for God."  In 1999, the construction permit was acquired by Crossroads Broadcasting LLC, based in Lexington.

The station signed on the air in late 1999.  It had a sports radio format, featuring programming from ESPN Sports Radio and local coverage of West Tennessee high school sports.  In 2023, the station flipped to a conservative talk format, with local hosts part of the day and syndicated talk shows nights and weekends.

References

External links

BFG
Talk radio stations in the United States
Conservative talk radio